Aleksis Aide (3 February 1888 – 1913) was an athlete from the Russian Empire. He competed in the 10 km walk at the 1912 Summer Olympics.

References

1888 births
1913 deaths
Male racewalkers from the Russian Empire
Olympic competitors for the Russian Empire
Athletes (track and field) at the 1912 Summer Olympics